Joseph Edward Willard (May 1, 1865 – April 4, 1924) was an American politician, philanthropist, and diplomat.

Early life
The son of prominent Washington hotelier and Union Army commissary major Joseph Clapp Willard (1820–1897) and former Confederate spy Antonia Ford, Joseph Willard had two brothers who died in infancy.

Career

Willard served for eight years in the Virginia House of Delegates, prior to his election as the 19th Lieutenant Governor of Virginia. He held that office from 1902 through 1906, leaving after an unsuccessful run for governor. The Virginia General Assembly then elected him a commissioner of the relatively new Virginia State Corporation Commission, where he served for four years.

In 1913, President Woodrow Wilson appointed Willard as the United States Ambassador to Spain. Ambassador Willard held his position under successive presidents of both political parties until shortly before his death.

Personal life
Willard and his wife, Belle Layton Wyatt (1869–1954), had two daughters, Belle Wyatt, (1892–1968) who later married Kermit Roosevelt on June 10, 1914, and Mary Elizabeth, (1898-1979) who later married The Hon. Mervyn Herbert, third son of 4th Earl of Carnarvon, in 1921.

His daughter, Belle, and Roosevelt had four children:
 Kermit Roosevelt Jr. (1916-2000); married Mary Lowe Gaddis (1917-2013) and had four children.
 Joseph Willard Roosevelt (1918-2008); married (1) Nancy Thayer/Cummings, daughter of poet E.E. Cummings and had two children; married (2) Carole Adele Russell and had three children.
 Belle Wyatt Roosevelt (1919-1985); married John Gorham Palfrey Jr., grandson of John G. Palfrey, 2nd great-grandson of William Palfrey, and grand-nephew of Francis Winthrop Palfrey; had three children.
 Dirck Roosevelt (1925-1953)

Willard had at least 12 grandchildren, including Mark Roosevelt; his great-grandchildren include Kermit Roosevelt III, John Palfrey and Quentin Palfrey.

Death 

Willard died in Manhattan, New York, on April 4, 1924. His remains were returned to Washington, D.C., for burial at Oak Hill cemetery.

Sources
 
Willard Family Papers, Library of Congress

1865 births
1924 deaths
Democratic Party members of the Virginia House of Delegates
Lieutenant Governors of Virginia
Ambassadors of the United States to Spain
Virginia Military Institute alumni
Virginia lawyers
19th-century American lawyers
20th-century American lawyers
People from Washington, D.C.
20th-century American diplomats
19th-century American politicians
20th-century American politicians
Burials at Oak Hill Cemetery (Washington, D.C.)